In algebra, the Krull–Akizuki theorem states the following: let A be a one-dimensional reduced noetherian ring, K its total ring of fractions. If B is a subring of a finite extension L of K containing A
then B is a one-dimensional noetherian ring. Furthermore, for every nonzero ideal I of B,  is finite over A.

Note that the theorem does not say that B is finite over A. The theorem does not extend to higher dimension. One important consequence of the theorem is that the integral closure of a Dedekind domain A in a finite extension of the field of fractions of A is again a Dedekind domain. This consequence does generalize to a higher dimension: the Mori–Nagata theorem states that the integral closure of a noetherian domain is a Krull domain.

Proof 
Here, we give a proof when . Let  be minimal prime ideals of A; there are finitely many of them. Then we have:
.
Now, if the theorem holds when A is a domain, then this implies that B is a one-dimensional noetherian domain since each  is and since . Hence, we reduced the proof to the case A is a domain. Let  be an ideal and let a be a nonzero element in the nonzero ideal  . Set . Since  is a zero-dim noetherian ring; thus, artinian, there is an l such that  for all . We claim

Since it suffices to establish the inclusion locally, we may assume A is a local ring with the maximal ideal . Let x be a nonzero element in B. Then, since A is noetherian, there is an n such that  and so . Thus,

Now, assume n is a minimum integer such that  and the last inclusion holds. If , then we easily see that . Hence, we have  and this establishes the claim. It now follows:

Hence,  has finite length as A-module. In particular, the image of I there is finitely generated and so I is finitely generated. Finally, the above shows that  has zero dimension and so B has dimension one.

References 

Nicolas Bourbaki, Commutative algebra

Theorems in algebra